Brazil is an extinct town in Washington County, in the U.S. state of Missouri. The GNIS classifies it as a populated place.

A post office called Brazil was established in 1889, and remained in operation until 1955. It is unknown why the name "Brazil" was applied to this community.

References

Ghost towns in Missouri
Former populated places in Washington County, Missouri